Maurel is a surname, and may refer to:

 Abdias Maurel (died 1705), French cavalry officer
 Patrice Maurel (born 1978), French footballer
 Victor Maurel (1848–1923), French operatic baritone

See also
 Maurel & Prom, a French oil company